Chang Kyou-chul (a.k.a. Chang Sun-gil; June 19, 1946 – April 19, 2000) was an Olympic boxing bronze medalist in South Korea. He renamed his name Kyou-chul to Sun-gil.

Amateur career
Chang won Asian Championship gold medals in flyweight in 1965 and in bantamweight in 1967.

He won the bronze medal in the bantamweight category at the 1968 Summer Olympics in Mexico City. Chang defeated 1967 European Championship bronze medalist Nikola Savov in the round of 16 and 1959 European Champion Horst Rascher in the quarterfinals. In the semifinals, Chang faced Eridadi Mukwanga of Uganda and knocked him down in the second round but lost by a split decision.

Results

Pro career
Chang turned pro in 1970 but had limited success.

In his third pro bout, Chang received his first loss after facing future two-time World Champion Hong Soo-hwan. In 1971 however, he captured the OPBF Super Bantamweight title with a win over Koichi Okada. In 1973, Chang faced off against WBA Bantamweight World Champion Romeo Anaya in a non-title bout in Tijuana, Mexico but was knocked out in the 8th round. He lost the OPBF champion belt in 1974 to future WBC Super Bantamweight Champion Yum Dong-kyun and retired later that year.

References

External links
 
 
 

1946 births
2000 deaths
Bantamweight boxers
Super-bantamweight boxers
Olympic bronze medalists for South Korea
Boxers at the 1968 Summer Olympics
Olympic boxers of South Korea
Olympic medalists in boxing
South Korean male boxers
Medalists at the 1968 Summer Olympics
People from Seoul
Sportspeople from Seoul